Acanthotrophon carduus is a species of sea snail, a marine gastropod mollusk in the family Muricidae in the genus Acanthotrophon, the murex snails or rock snails.

Description
The shell is dull white in color with a relatively coarse scaley sculpture consisting of rows of spines with one or two longer spines near the aperture.  This taxon is placed in the Trophoninae rather than the Coraliophilidae because it has a radula.  Compare with Acanthotrophon sentus.  Length 25 mm, diameter 16 mm.

Distribution
This species is found subtidally in deep water from Mazatlan, Mexico to Peru, occurring mostly offshore.

References

Muricopsinae
Gastropods described in 1833
Taxa named by William Broderip